The foreign relations between Pope Pius IX and France were characterized by the hostility of the Third Republic's anticlerical politics, as well as Napoleon III's influence over the papal states.  This did not stop, however, Church life in France from flourishing during much of Pius IX's pontificate.

Concord between  liberal and conservative factions
When Pius IX assumed the papacy in 1846, French Catholics were divided into a liberal fraction under Charles Forbes René de Montalembert and a conservative fraction under Louis Veuillot. They agreed on right to private schools, freedom of instruction, financial support by the State and a rejection of gallicanism. Pius addressed the French bishops with his encyclical Inter Multiplices in which he asked for concord of mind and will among the French. Under Napoleon III, French Catholics got much of what they wanted. Napoleon III, because of his defense of the Papal States, was also seen as a defender of the Church and of Catholic interests.

Blossoming of Church life in France 
French religious life blossomed under Pius IX. Many French Catholics wished the dogmatization of Papal infallibility and the assumption of Mary in the forthcoming ecumenical council. The French bishops, with some notable exceptions were faithful to the Holy See. During the pontificate of Pius IX, some five Catholic Universities were founded in the cities of Lille, Angers, Lyon and Toulouse, in which the clerics were educated in a strict, although some argued, scientifically less than desirable manner.

1849 attack on the papal states
In April 1849, General Oudinot's expeditionary force made its direct attack, and the Constituent Assembly in Rome passed a resolution of protest (7 May 1849), French President Louis Napoleon (the future Napoleon III of France) encouraged Pius IX and assured him of reinforcements from France. The Pope appealed for support, and Napoleon — who had engaged in a liberal insurrection in the states of the Church himself in 1831—now sent troops that crushed the republic (29 June), although Pius IX did not return to Rome until April 1850.

Alliance between Cavour and Napoleon III
Napoleon III and Cavour (Premier to Victor Emmanuel) agreed to war on Austria. Following the Battle of Magenta (4 July 1859) the Austrian forces withdrew from the Papal States, precipitating their loss to Sardinia-Piedmont. Revolutionaries in Romagna called upon Sardinia-Piedmont for annexation. In February 1860, Victor Emmanuel II demanded Umbria and the Marches; when his demand was refused, he took them by force.

Reliance on French and Austrian soldiers
The Papal States were coming under increased pressure from anti-papal nationalists—notably Victor Emmanuel II of Sardinia-Piedmont (later king of Italy). The Pope was obliged to rely on French and Austrian soldiers to maintain order and protect his territories. An army of volunteers was created in 1860: the Papal zouaves (zuavi pontifici) under the command of general de La Moricière. They came from different countries including France, Holland (the majority), Belgium, Canada and England. Even from the United States and from Italy as well.

French troops in Rome until 1870
The French troops remained in Rome to protect the status quo until 1870 (see September Convention), while the Risorgimento united the remainder of Italy, leaving the block of the Papal States in the center. Thus, for twenty years, the pope ruled the Church State under the protection of French military forces, a fact which further limited his popularity among fervent Italian nationalists.

Pius was met with a sullen reception on his return to Rome, the Romans being unimpressed by the return of the pontiff at the point of French bayonets.  He blessed the French troops, held a Te Deum and signalized his return to Rome by an extension of his 1846 amnesty and by a new Indulgence.  He frequently repeated his main message that he had returned as a pastor and not as an avenger, in urbem reverses pastor et non ultor.

References 

F
French Second Republic